The Civil Aviation Department MG-1 was a one-off Indian motor glider, seating two side by side and first flown in 1983.

Design and development
Design work on the MG-1 began in October 1981. It was a low wing monoplane with spruce and plywood wings with a forward sweep of 1.5° at quarter chord mounted with 3.25° of dihedral. The ailerons were fabric covered; there were no flaps but wooden airbrakes extended above and below the wing.  The cantilever, unswept empennage was similarly constructed and the low set tailplane carried elevators with a trim tab on the starboard side.

The fuselage of the MG-1 was steel framed and fabric covered with the exception of a glass fibre engine cowling.  This housed a conventionally nose mounted, 74.5 kW (100 hp) flat four Continental O-200 piston engine driving a non-retractable propeller. Its cockpit seated two side by side under a rearward sliding canopy. The conventional undercarriage had main wheels with rubber cord shock absorbers and brakes, assisted by a steerable tailwheel.

Only one MG-1 was built. It made its first flight on 30 May 1983 and gained certification in December 1985.

Specifications
All performance data are at maximum take-off weight

References

1980s Indian aircraft
Civil Aviation Department aircraft